The 2021 TCR Denmark Touring Car Series is the second season of the TCR Denmark Touring Car Series.

Teams and drivers

Calendar and results
The 2021 calendar was introduced on December 12, 2020. The first and second stages was postponed on April 22 to a later date. . 

Scoring system

Drivers' championship

† – Drivers did not finish the race, but were classified as they completed over 75% of the race distance.

Teams' championship

† – Drivers did not finish the race, but were classified as they completed over 75% of the race distance.

Trophy championship

† – Drivers did not finish the race, but were classified as they completed over 75% of the race distance.

Under 23 championship

† – Drivers did not finish the race, but were classified as they completed over 75% of the race distance.

References

External links 
 

Denmark
TCR
Motorsport competitions in Denmark